Bahamas competed at the 2014 Summer Youth Olympics, in Nanjing, China from 16 August to 28 August 2014.

Medalists

Athletics

Bahamas qualified 8 athletes.

Qualification Legend: Q=Final A (medal); qB=Final B (non-medal); qC=Final C (non-medal); qD=Final D (non-medal); qE=Final E (non-medal)

Boys
Track & road events

Girls
Track & road events

Field events

Sailing

Bahamas qualified a boat based on its performance at the Byte CII North American & Caribbean Continental Qualifiers.

Swimming

Bahamas qualified three swimmers.

Boys

Girls

Tennis

Bahamas qualified two athletes based on the 9 June 2014 ITF World Junior Rankings.

Singles

Doubles

References

Nations at the 2014 Summer Youth Olympics
2014
Youth Olympics